The Plot was a heavy rock  band formed in 2003 by bassist Pete Way and his long-time friend, guitarist Michael Schenker. The two wanted to form a band like UFO again and asked Phil Mogg and Andy Parker to regroup with them, but tension was still fiery between the ex-bandmates, although Way, Schenker and Mogg had been involved in recording as UFO for the album Sharks in 2002. So instead, Way and Schenker recruited drummer Jeff Martin. This band released one album, also entitled The Plot.

"We decided to release The Plot at this time for several reasons. A bootleg of The Plot was becoming very available throughout the world. We wanted to get the proper version out there before it was too late. It is great finally see this record released. Michael and I are very proud of it," Way said in an interview about his reunion with Schenker.

Musical groups established in 2003